Yalghaar (previously known as Delta Echo Foxtrot) is a 2017 Pakistani war-epic film directed by Hassan Rana. The film is produced by MindWorks Media and is based on the true story of Pakistan Army's Swat Operation. Yalghaar was facilitated by Brigadier Syed Mujtaba Tirmizi from Inter-Services Public Relations -ISPR.

The film "explores what happens in the lives of those involved, including the militants and how all of them are affected at a personal level because of the ongoing operation". It stars Shaan Shahid in the lead role, along with Humayun Saeed, Adnan Siddiqui, Armeena Khan, Aleeze Nasser, Ayesha Omer, Sana Bucha, Bilal Ashraf. It is the most expensive Pakistani movie to date. Apart from budget and extensive cast, the film features 150 written characters. On 19 December 2014, Hassan Waqas Rana revealed that this film is a tribute to slain children of the 2014 Peshawar school attack.

Plot
The film is based on an actual military operation conducted in the Piochar region of Swat district.

Cast
 Shaan Shahid as Colonel Asad in Special Services Group of Pakistan Army
 Humayun Saeed as Torjan - A Militant leader of the local area who has established himself as an Ameer of the area
 Adnan Siddiqui as Lt Col. Imran
 Bilal Ashraf as Capt. Bilal (SSG)
 Ahmad Taha Ghani as Capt. Asif - Combat Group Pilot  Pakistan Army
 Wali Yousaf as Capt. Abdullah - Combat Group Pilot  Pakistan Army
 Ali Rehman Khan as Capt. Ali - A technical expert who conducts location from army headquarter
 Ali Sohail as Capt. Asif - A technical expert who conducts location from army headquarter
 Sana Bucha as Sadia - A Reporter, and love interest of Col. Asad
 Aleeze Nasser as Fareeha - Wife of Lt Col. Imran
 Armeena Khan as Jero
 Uzma Khan as Capt. Samia - A Military Doctor
 Ayesha Omer as Zarmina
 Gohar Rasheed as Baran
 Syed Irfan Gilani as DG MI Sohail - Military Intelligence Director General.
 Hassan Rana as Maj. General Hassan
 Ashir Azeem as Maj. General Ahmed
 Talib Rizvi as Maj. General Taimur 
 Ayub Khosa as Colonel Jogezai
 Sikander Rizvi as Azhar
 Zarrar Azeem as Capt. Zarrar
 Umair Jaswal as Capt. Umair (cameo appearance)

Production

Development 
Soon after the release of Waar back in  2013, Hassan Rana signed two more films with ARY Films sequel of Waar known as Waar 2 and Delta Echo Foxtrot later known as Yalghaar. ISPR was approached in order to get more insight of the facts and figures of the Swat Operation. Hassan Rana wanted to know how it feels to be a soldier who is fighting on the front lines of war.
 
The movie went into production after about 3 years of extensive research. Apart from using a vast number of choppers and heavy ammunition, an artificial tunnel was dug in Karachi to replicate one found in North Waziristan.

In preparation for their roles, all actors spent time with their real-life alter egos. Humayun Saeed, who plays the role of a militant, spent days with captured militants in order to prepare for his role.

Duraid Qureshi, the CEO of Hum Network Limited announced at the 4th Hum Awards that the film will be distributed under the banner of Hum Films.

Release
Yalghaar was officially released on 25 June 2017 for the Eid al-Fitr holiday on 112 screens across Pakistan. It was also released in 22 countries at the same time including United States, UK, UAE, etc.

Box office
The film has collected 1.75 crores on day 1 of the Eid, 2.40 crore on day 2 of the Eid, 2.20 crore on day 3 of the Eid. Making a grand total of 6.35 crore as Eid collection. It emerged victorious against other releases of the Eid. These figures are confirmed by movie marketing agents.

On day 4 of its release, it racked in 1.40 crore, which is the record collection of any movie on Thursday in Pakistan. On first weekend of its release, it collected 1.30 crore, 1.50 crore and 1.35 crore respectively on Friday, Saturday and Sunday taking its total collection to 11.9 crore. Nasar Khan, PR & Publications associate manager at HUM Network, local distributors of Yalghaar, confirmed the numbers "These numbers are accurate".

Critical reception
Rafay Mahmood of The Express Tribune said that the film had its "heart in the right place", depicting "what an average soldier goes through in order to serve his country while taking care of his friends, love life and family" while "engaged on two different fronts with two different kinds of enemies — external and internal." However, he criticized the film's loose plot, describing it as an "omelette", as well as forced English dialogues, and the director's romanticism of the "posh side of the army lifestyle". He noted that if done right, the film "had the potential to wake up the sleeping giant that the Eid box-office can be."

Areebah Shahid writing for Bolo Jawan gave the film 3 stars, appreciating the cinematography and war sequences but criticizing the script and editing.

Momin Ali Munshi of Galaxy Lollywood described the film's starting action scenes as "wonderfully executed" and having "definitely set the right motion for the film", in addition to praising its background score; however, he noted that the introduction of multiple characters weakened the sequence of the plot, which made it a "star-studded hot mess".

Faraz Talat of Dawn praised the acting of Adnan Siddiqui, Sana Bucha and Ayub Khoso, but said the movie suffered from an incoherent storyline, in addition to weaknesses in choreography, dialogues, production, and certain aspects of character development. While noting Yalghaar's expensive production value, he concluded that the "film industry needs more than just patriotism; it needs a will to explore new artistic territory."

Sana Gilani of Daily Pakistan called Yalghaar "one of the most promising movies of [the] year" and viewed all characters positively, save for the female extras and the antagonist role played by Humayun Saeed, which she described as "aloof". According to Gilani, critics appeared to miss the fact that the movie relayed true events, which made the storyline and narrative obvious.

Omair Alavi of Brandsynario commended Yalghaar as a "better option" for those wanting to watch a Pakistani film, and approved its action sequences, patriotic and emotion-laced appeal, war theme, as well as its cast which featured renowned and upcoming stars. However, he noted there were certain technical glitches, ordinarily executed scenes, and misplaced dialogues.

See also 
 List of directorial debuts
 List of Pakistani films of 2017

References

External links
 

2017 films
2010s action war films
Pakistani action war films
Films scored by Channi Singh
2010s Urdu-language films
Insurgency in Khyber Pakhtunkhwa fiction
Films about terrorism in Asia
Films set in Karachi
Films shot in Khyber Pakhtunkhwa
MindWorks Media films
War films based on actual events
Epic films based on actual events
Films set in Khyber Pakhtunkhwa
Films directed by Hassan Rana
Pakistani epic films
Military of Pakistan in films
Hum films
2017 directorial debut films